Bimeda is one of 54 parishes in Cangas del Narcea, a municipality within the province and autonomous community of Asturias, in northern Spain. 
-

Villages
Bimeda
Bustieḷḷu
Ḷḷavachos
Murias
La Pena Samartino
San Xuan del Monte
Samartinu de Bimeda
El Vaḷḷe
Viḷḷauril de Bimeda
Viḷḷar de Bimeda

Parishes in Cangas del Narcea